Ajani "Jay" Fortune (born 30 December 2002) is a professional footballer who plays as an attacking midfielder for Major League Soccer  club Atlanta United. Born in the United States, he represents the Trinidad and Tobago national team.

Club career
On 11 July 2020, at just 17 years-old, Fortune made his professional debut for Atlanta United 2, the USL Championship affiliate of Atlanta United.  That same season Fortune scored his first professional goal against Miami FC with a right-footed strike from outside the box. 

On 27 August 2021, Fortune signed a professional contract with Atlanta United 2.

After a series of impressive performances for Atlanta United 2, Atlanta United rewarded Fortune with a first-team contract at the club, becoming just the 14th player in franchise history to transition from the academy to the first-team. Fortune was then named by head coach Jack Collison as team captain for Atlanta United 2 for the remainder of the 2022 USL season.

He made his debut for the first team against Charlotte FC on March 11, 2023.

International career 
Fortune was selected for the Trinidad and Tobago U-17 National Team for the 2019 CONCACAF Under-17 Championship. Fortune played all four games for Trinidad and Tobago as the team were eliminated in the second round of the tournament

At 18 years-old, he then received his first senior call-up on 26 January 2021 ahead of a friendly with the United States. He made his debut in the game, as a starter.

Personal 
Fortune's brother, Dre, plays for Nõmme Kalju FC of the Meistriliiga.

References

External links
 

2002 births
Living people
Citizens of Trinidad and Tobago through descent
Trinidad and Tobago footballers
Trinidad and Tobago international footballers
Trinidad and Tobago youth international footballers
American soccer players
American sportspeople of Trinidad and Tobago descent
Association football midfielders
Atlanta United 2 players
Soccer players from Georgia (U.S. state)
USL Championship players
Homegrown Players (MLS)
Atlanta United FC players